Hemidactylus vietnamensis, also known as Vietnam leaf-toed gecko or Vietnam house gecko,  is a species of gecko. It is endemic to Vietnam.

References

Hemidactylus
Reptiles described in 1984
Endemic fauna of Vietnam
Reptiles of Vietnam